Hockey Night is a 1984 Canadian coming-of-age television drama film by Canadian screenwriters Jack Blum and Paul Shapiro. It stars Megan Follows, Yannick Bisson, and Rick Moranis. It was released on December 14, 1984.

The film was shot primarily in Parry Sound, Ontario, and arena scenes were filmed at the Centennial Arena in North York, Ontario. It was the feature film debut of future Murdoch Mysteries star Yannick Bisson, and was an early screen appearance for Canadian stage and screen star Megan Follows.

Plot 

Cathy Yarrow arrives in Parry Sound, Ontario with her mother and sister from Toronto following the separation of her parents. As the town has no team for girls, she attends tryouts for the local boys' hockey team, and wins a spot as one of the team's goaltenders. Even after she plays well in the first couple of games, the team sponsor indicates displeasure at having a female on the team, and threatens to withdraw his sponsorship. The young players must then decide whether to continue with or without Cathy.

Restoration 
In an unusual step for a 1980s made-for-television movie, the film was given a 4K resolution restoration in 2016 and screened theatrically in Toronto and Vancouver.

See also 
 Justine Blainey-Broker

References

External links
 
 

1984 films
English-language Canadian films
Women's ice hockey in Canada
Films about women's sports
Canadian ice hockey films
CBC Television original films
Canadian drama television films
1980s Canadian films